Citizen Baines is an American drama series television series created by Emmy Award-winning producer Lydia Woodward, that stars James Cromwell. The series premiered on CBS September 29, 2001 and ended on November 3, 2001.

Synopsis
Cromwell starred as Elliot Baines, a former three-term U.S. Senator who loses a re-election for the Senate and goes back home to Seattle to re-establish his relationships with his three grown daughters Ellen (Embeth Davidtz), Reeva (Jane Adams), and Dori (Jacinda Barrett).

Cast

Main
 James Cromwell as Elliot Baines
 Embeth Davidtz as Ellen Baines Croland
 Jane Adams as Reeva Baines Eidenberg
 Jacinda Barrett as Dori Baines
 Arye Gross as Shel Eidenberg
 Scotty Leavenworth as Otis Croland
 Matt McCoy as Arthur Croland

Recurring
Tom Verica as Andy Carlson
 McCaleb Burnett as Claude Waverley
 Easton Gage as Sam Eidenberg
 David Kriegel as David Goldman
 Bryn Lauren Lemon as Ruthie Eidenberg
 Emmett Shoemaker as Otis Croland
Paul McCrane as Sherman Bloom

Episodes

Reception

Critical
PopMatters wrote that, "Citizen Baines showed genuine signs of bucking the CBS feel-good Saturday night orthodoxy, by assuming the complex task of creating family-friendly entertainment without soaking in sentiment the raw textures of domestic life... But Citizen Baines symbolizes the lack of imagination driving so much of prime-time, whether drama or sitcom, cable or network..." USA Todays Robert Bianco gave the series a negative, one-and-a-half star review, and stated, "After all, the only interesting thing about Elliott Baines is his job as a U.S. senator — and he loses that at the end of Saturday's premiere. Don't worry: I'm not revealing anything that the "citizen" in the title didn't already tell you."

Ratings
Scheduled on Saturdays following Touched by an Angel, the series ranked #90 (the lowest rank for a regularly scheduled series on one of the Big Four networks), and averaged 8.2 million viewers. Due to the low ratings, CBS canceled the series in October 2001 after six of the nine episodes produced were aired.

Award nomination

References

External links
 
 

2000s American drama television series
2001 American television series debuts
2001 American television series endings
CBS original programming
Television series by Warner Bros. Television Studios
Television shows set in Seattle